CROW Design Manual for Bicycle Traffic is a publication on bicycle transportation planning and engineering in the Netherlands. It is published by CROW, a non profit agency advising Directorate-General for Public Works and Water Management formerly Ministry of Transport and Water Management (Netherlands). It is the most influential bicycle traffic planning manual, both worldwide and on cycling in the Netherlands. It was last updated in 2016. It is considered best practice.

History
First published in the 1970s, it was most recently revised and published including in English, in 2016.

See also
Bikeway controversies
Bikeway safety
National Association of City Transportation Officials#Urban Bikeway Design Guide

References

External links

CROW Platform - CROW publications in English

Bicycle transportation planning
Cycling infrastructure in the Netherlands